Savile Park Cricket Ground on Lumley Street in Castleford held a list A limited overs game in May 1967 when Yorkshire CCC played Cambridgeshire in the Gillette Cup, bowling the visitors out for 43.  In May 2000 the touring Zimbabwe team defeated a strong Marylebone Cricket Club side in another List A game at the venue .  It has also hosted many Yorkshire Second XI games and Minor Counties fixtures in addition to Castleford club cricket.

Cricket grounds in West Yorkshire
Castleford